Fire at Sea is a 2016 Italian documentary film directed by Gianfranco Rosi. It won the Golden Bear at the 66th Berlin International Film Festival. The film was nominated for the Academy Award for Best Documentary Feature at the 89th Academy Awards. It was also selected as the Italian entry for the Best Foreign Language Film at the awards but it was not nominated in that category.

Overview
The film was shot on the Sicilian island of Lampedusa during the European migrant crisis, and sets the migrants' dangerous Mediterranean crossing against a background of the ordinary life of the islanders. The main characters are a twelve-year-old boy from a local fishing family and a doctor who treats the migrants on their arrival. In his acceptance speech for the Golden Bear award, Rosi stated that his intention was to heighten awareness of the migrant situation, saying, "It's not acceptable that people die crossing the sea to escape from tragedies."

Synopsis
A young boy, Samuele Pucillo, cuts a forked twig from a pine tree to make a slingshot. With his friend Mattias Cucina, he then enjoys carving eyes and mouth on some shovels of prickly pear and throwing stones with the slingshot, as if against an enemy army. This happens on the island of Lampedusa, while the men of the Italian Navy's district office, received by radio a request for help, activate the search at sea with naval units and helicopters of the Coast Guard. Meanwhile, life on the island continues. A housewife, Maria Signorello, while preparing lunch, listens to the local radio station led by Pippo Fragapane who broadcasts music and songs on request and gives news about sightings and rescues at sea.

Refugees and migrants from North Africa on overcrowded boats are taken on board Coast Guard ships and then, transhipped on spears and patrol boats, are taken ashore. Here they find Pietro Bartolo, the doctor who directs the outpatient clinic in Lampedusa and who for years has been making his first visit to every migrant who disembarks on the island. They are then transferred by bus to the Lampedusa immigrant reception center, searched and photographed. Samuele talks to Francesco Mannino, a relative fisherman who tells him about when he was a sailor on merchant ships living always on board for six, seven months, between sky and sea. A diver, Francesco Paterna, dives to fish for sea urchins despite the rough sea.

At home, during a thunderstorm, Samuel studies and then listens to his grandmother, Maria Costa, who tells him about when, during the Second World War, at night the military ships passed throwing light rockets into the air and the sea turned red, it seemed there was "fire at sea". Maria Signorello calls the radio to dedicate a cheerful swing Fuocoammare to her fisherman son, wishing the bad weather will end soon so that he can go out on the boat to work. Meanwhile song is on the air, in the immigrant reception centre a group of refugees sing a heartfelt song accompanied by the story of their vicissitudes.

Dr. Bartolo, showing the photo of a boat with 860 people, tells of those who have not made it. Especially those who sail below deck for days, tired, hungry, dehydrated, soaked and burned by fuel. Moved and upset, the doctor tells of how many he could treat and how many, however, had to inspect the bodies recovered at sea, including many women and children, making it very difficult to get used to. So, while Samuele grows up and faces his difficulties to become a sailor, the tragedy of migrants and the commitment of rescuers continues at sea.

Reception
The film has a 95% rating from Rotten Tomatoes, based on 93 reviews with an average rating of 7.82 out of 10. The website's critical consensus states, "Fire at Sea offers a clear-eyed yet empathetic look at a corner of the world whose terrain may be unfamiliar to many, but whose people's story remains universal". It also has a score of 87 out of 100 on Metacritic, based on 20 critics, indicating "universal acclaim".

Meryl Streep, chair of the Berlin jury, called the film "a daring hybrid of captured footage and deliberate storytelling that allows us to consider what documentary can do. It is urgent, imaginative and necessary filmmaking." Andrew Pulver, writing for The Guardian,  described the documentary as having "a distinctive, humane cinematic style" and being "a collection of tiny details that morph, almost by osmosis, into a shocking excavation of the mechanics of crisis." He praises it for approaching the tragedy indirectly, via the people of Lampedusa. The film was also appreciated by the Italian Prime Minister Matteo Renzi, who stated that he would carry with him 27 DVDs of the film to a session of the European Council. Each one of the copies was given to a head of state or government of the European Union.

The Economist thought it had "beautiful cinematography and searing images, but also odd choices and murky priorities" and took issue with the film's lack of relation between the refugee crisis and the impact it had on the lives of the islanders interviewed.

In 2019, The Guardian ranked Fire at Sea in 53rd place in its 100 best films of the 21st century list.

See also
 List of submissions to the 89th Academy Awards for Best Foreign Language Film
 List of Italian submissions for the Academy Award for Best Foreign Language Film

References

External links
 

2016 films
2016 documentary films
Italian documentary films
2010s Italian-language films
Documentary films about illegal immigration to Italy
Films directed by Gianfranco Rosi
Films shot in Italy
Golden Bear winners
European Film Awards winners (films)
Lampedusa e Linosa
Works about the European migrant crisis